The Washington State House elections, 2014 were biennial elections in which each of the 49 legislative districts in Washington chose two people to represent them in the state house. Roughly half of the members of the Washington Senate were elected concurrently to four-year terms from the same legislative districts. The elections were held on November 4, 2014.

Top two primary elections on August 5, 2014 determined which two candidates appeared on the November ballot. Candidates were allowed to write in a  party preference.

Overview

Results

Composition

Select Nonpartisan Blanket Primary Results

District 4

District 10

District 14

District 17

District 18

District 21

District 28

District 33

District 35

District 42

District 49

General election results

Districts 1-9
District 1

District 2

District 3

District 4

District 5

District 6

District 7

District 8

District 9

Districts 10-19
District 10

District 11

District 12

District 13

District 14

District 15

District 16

District 17

District 18

District 19

Districts 20-29
District 20

District 21

District 22

District 23

District 24

District 25

District 26

District 27

District 28

District 29

Districts 30-39
District 30

District 31

District 32

District 33

District 34

District 35

District 36

District 37

District 38

District 39

Districts 40-49
District 40

District 41

District 42

District 43

District 44

District 45

District 46

District 47

District 48

District 49

Notes

References

External links
Public Disclosure Commission on Candidates
2014 Candidates who have filed 
Washington State Official 2014 Primary Results

Washington House of Representatives elections
2014 Washington (state) elections
Washington House of Representatives